The Association of Muslim Lawyers (AML) is an organisation in the United Kingdom which campaigns for legal rights for Muslims and others, and to aid Muslims working in the legal professions.

External links

Islamic organisations based in the United Kingdom
Legal organisations based in England and Wales
1993 establishments in the United Kingdom
Organizations established in 1993
Law-related professional associations